Richard Hewitt (13 February 1844 – 21 March 1920) was an Australian cricketer. He played eight first-class matches for New South Wales between 1865/66 and 1872/73.

See also
 List of New South Wales representative cricketers

References

External links
 

1844 births
1920 deaths
Australian cricketers
New South Wales cricketers
Cricketers from Beverley